Eka Gigauri (Georgian: ეკა გიგაური) (born April 14, 1978) is a public figure and a civic activist who has served as the Executive Director of Transparency International Georgia, the national chapter of the global Transparency International anti-corruption movement, since December 21, 2010.
 In 2019 Eka Gigauri was elected as a board member of Transparency International Global movement and in 2021 she was reelected as a board member for a three-year term.  In July 2022, Eka Gigauri was elected as a member of OGP Steering Committee for a three-year term.

Education

Gigauri graduated from Tbilisi State University in Tbilisi, Georgia in 1999 with a degree in International Relations. She continued her studies at the Caucasus School of Business, where she obtained her master's degree in Business Administration in 2001. In 2010 Gigauri completed her second Masters and received  LLM from VU University Amsterdam in the Netherlands.

In addition to degree programs in 2007 she attended the Senior Executive Seminar Course at George C. Marshall European Center for Security Studies.

In 2017 Eka Gigauri became the fellow of Stanford University CDDRL (Center on Democracy, Development and the Rule of law) "Draper Hills Fellows Program on Democracy and Development".

Career

Early career

Gigauri started her career in 1996 as an intern in the Parliament of Georgia and Georgian Public Broadcaster. She continued her early work with the Georgian government as an Officer in the International Relations Office in the Ministry of Transport of Georgia (Civil Aviation Department) during 1998 and 1999. She then worked in the Department of International Organizations, UN Office, at the Ministry of Foreign Affairs of Georgia.

Public Relations and Marketing

Gigauri started working in PR and marketing in 2002, when she joined the Institute of Polling and Marketing as a Public Relations Consultant. Later, in 2003 she was hired by Marriott International as a Public Affairs Coordinator in Tbilisi.

Border Security

In 2004, Gigauri joined the public service and became the Head of Border Policy Provision Department in the Border Police of Georgia. She was promoted in 2005 to Deputy Head of the Border Police. She oversaw modernization of the force and cleaned up corruption. She also participated in negotiations with the EU on European Neighborhood Policy Action Plan (ENP AP). Gigauri worked on a long-term development strategy for the Georgian Border Police, as well as the enactment of the Integrated Border Management Strategy and the State Law on Border Police of Georgia. 

In the following years, Gigauri worked as an expert at Caucasus Interconnect in the Hague, Netherlands. She provided recommendations in the field of security, including border security and migration in South Caucasian countries.

Transparency International Georgia

Since November 2010, Gigauri has been serving as the Executive Director at Transparency International Georgia (TI Georgia).

Under Gigauri's leadership TI Georgia greatly expanded both in terms of the people employed, but also in terms of donor funding attracted. Respectively, the portfolio of activities and projects of the organization was also increased.

Activism

Gigauri has been actively involved in various civic activism movements, including "Must Carry/Must Offer," which was eventually adopted into the Georgian Law on Broadcasting (Article 40)14. She was also one of the founders of the campaign "This affects you- They Are Still Listening," which petitioned the Georgian government to legislate against illegal surveillance.

Memberships

 2015–Present, Ex Officio Board Member of International Chamber of Commerce (ICC Georgia)
 2015–2018, Member of the Civil Society Platform under the EU-Georgia Association Agreement
 2014 - Present, Board member of the Coalition for Independent and Transparent Judiciary 
 2016 - Present, Board member of the Coalition for Euro-Atlantic Georgia
 2014–2016, Board Member of Georgian International Arbitration Center (GIAC) 
 2013–2018, Member of pardon commission under the President of Georgia 
 2013 - Member of commission for selection of the members of central election commission 
 2013–2014, Supervisory Board Member of Municipal Development Fund of Georgia 
 2010–Present, Member of Georgia's National Anti-Corruption Council

Noteworthy Publications

 Russian Border Regions - the social and political aspects of the existed problem (Co-author, 2006)
 So what about the NATO-Georgia relation? (Opinion in dfwatch.net 2012) 
 NGOs’ proposal: concrete step towards fair elections (Opinion in dfwatch.net 2012) 
 Is Georgia's government still trying to improve the investment climate? (Opinion in dfwatch.net 2012) 
 Is Georgia a part of, or apart from, the Open Government Partnership? (Opinion in dfwatch.net 2012) 
 Risk of corruption in Georgia (Opinion in dfwatch.net 2012)

References

1978 births
Politicians from Georgia (country)
Living people